The Sakuma–Hattori equation is a mathematical model for predicting the amount of thermal radiation, radiometric flux or radiometric power emitted from a perfect blackbody or received by a thermal radiation detector.

History 
The Sakuma–Hattori equation was first proposed by Fumihiro Sakuma, Akira Ono and Susumu Hattori in 1982. In 1996, a study investigated the usefulness of various forms of the Sakuma–Hattori equation. This study showed the Planckian form to provide the best fit for most applications. This study was done for 10 different forms of the Sakuma–Hattori equation containing not more than three fitting variables. In 2008, BIPM CCT-WG5 recommended its use for radiation thermometry uncertainty budgets below 960 °C.

General form 
The Sakuma–Hattori equation gives the electromagnetic signal from thermal radiation based on an object's temperature. The signal can be electromagnetic flux or signal produced by a detector measuring this radiation. It has been suggested that below the silver point, a method using the Sakuma–Hattori equation be used. In its general form it looks like

where:
  is the scalar coefficient
  is the second radiation constant (0.014387752 m⋅K)
  is the temperature-dependent effective wavelength in meters
  is the absolute temperature in kelvins

Planckian form

Derivation 

The Planckian form is realized by the following substitution:

Making this substitution renders the following the Sakuma–Hattori equation in the Planckian form.

 Sakuma–Hattori equation (Planckian form)
 
 Inverse equation 
 
 First derivative

Discussion 

The Planckian form is recommended for use in calculating uncertainty budgets for radiation thermometry and infrared thermometry. It is also recommended for use in calibration of radiation thermometers below the silver point.

The Planckian form resembles Planck's law.

However the Sakuma–Hattori equation becomes very useful when considering low-temperature, wide-band radiation thermometry. To use Planck's law over a wide spectral band, an integral like the following would have to be considered:

This integral yields an incomplete polylogarithm function, which can make its use very cumbersome.
The standard numerical treatment expands the incomplete integral in a geometric series of the exponential

after substituting , . Then

provides an approximation if the sum is truncated at some order.

The Sakuma–Hattori equation shown above was found to provide the best curve-fit for interpolation of scales for radiation thermometers among a number of alternatives investigated.

The inverse Sakuma–Hattori function can be used without iterative calculation. This is an additional advantage over integration of Planck's law.

Other forms 

The 1996 paper investigated 10 different forms. They are listed in the chart below in order of quality of curve-fit to actual radiometric data.

See also 

Stefan–Boltzmann law
Planck's law
Rayleigh–Jeans law
Wien approximation
Wien's displacement law
Kirchhoff's law of thermal radiation
Infrared thermometer
Pyrometer
Thin filament pyrometry
Thermography
Black body
Thermal radiation
Radiance
Emissivity
 ASTM Subcommittee E20.02 on Radiation Thermometry

Notes

References 

Statistical mechanics
Equations
1982 in science